Kuppuswami Sampath (15 September 1947 – 6 March 2023) was an Indian footballer who played as a goalkeeper. He played for the India national team squad that won a bronze medal at the 1970 Asian Games in Bangkok. He played for the MEG club in Bangalore.

Honours
India
Asian Games Bronze Medal: 1970
Merdeka Tournament third place: 1970
Pesta Sukan Cup (Singapore): 1971

	Dempo SC
Rovers Cup: 1975

References

1947 births
2023 deaths
Indian footballers
Footballers from Bangalore
Dempo SC players
Association football goalkeepers
India international footballers
Footballers at the 1970 Asian Games
Asian Games medalists in football
Asian Games bronze medalists for India
Medalists at the 1970 Asian Games